Kim Dale FRSB, born in Cheltenham, England on 6 January 1971, is a research scientist based in the Cell and Developmental unit of School of Life Sciences at the University of Dundee, as well as being the Associate Dean International for UoD and the University Academic Regional Lead for ASEAN.

In 2005 Dale established her own research group as a Royal Society University Research Fellow in Dundee. Her research is focused on the investigation of the molecular mechanisms regulating the vertebrae embryonic segmentation clock.

Early life and career 
Dale attended University of Southampton (UoS) in 1983, where she was awarded Bachelor (BcS) of Science in Molecular Cell Biology with first class honours in 1990.

After leaving UoS she achieved a PhD in Developmental Neurobiology in University College London in 1997.

Dale began her research career in the lab of Marysia Placzek, investigating tissues and signals involved in the induction and patterning of the forebrain ventral neuroectoderm of chick embryos at early stages of development. Following this, Dale obtained a postdoctoral (PhD) position in the lab of Olivier Pourquié, where she began to investigate underlying molecular mechanisms of the segmentation clock, specifically in relation to the Notch signalling pathway.

In August 2002, Dale worked as a senior research specialist in the lab of Olivier Pourquié at the Stowers Institute Kansas City, Missouri in the United States of America, until December 2004. Dale returned to Britain to launch her independent laboratory at the University of Dundee (UoD) in January 2005. She was awarded tenure in 2009 and is now professor of molecular Developmental Biology. In addition to her role as research scientist she is also the Associate Dean (International) in the UoD school of Life sciences and the university academic lead for international activity in ASEAN region, where she holds the position of guest professor at Taylors University, Malaysia. Through the work of Dale and her team UoD has a strong working relationship with the National University of Singapore, Taylors University and the British High Commission in Malaysia. This allows many students to undertake summer research opportunities as well as semester or year long exchanges in partner Universities in Europe and further afield.

Research 
Dale's PhD research projects include the Wellcome 4-Year PhD Programme in Integrated Molecular, Cellular and Translational Biology and the MRC DTP 4 Year PhD Programme.

Dale's lab looks at molecular interactions and crosstalk between various signalling pathways that cells use to communicate in order to build tissues and organs during the establishment of the vertebrae axis.

Recent research by Dale and colleagues discovered new insight into the role of Notch in developmental segmentation which has opened avenues to explore the potential association of mis-regulated Notch signalling in the context of cancer. Further details can be found in their primary publication "CDK 1 and CDK 2 regulate NICD 1 turnover and the periodicity of the segmentation clock".

Dale is currently involved in an active project at the Medical Research Council which focuses on Fine-Scale Regulation of Notch Signalling Dynamics, in the Context of the Vertebrate Segmentation Clock. This project began on 14/Aug/2019 and is scheduled to completion on 13/Aug/2022.

Awards and recognition 

 Best Postgraduate Supervisor – DUSA Student Led Teaching Awards (2018)
 British Society of Developmental Biology Secretary (2008–2013)
 Fellow of the Society of Biology (2012)
 The Royal Society University Research Fellowship (renewal) (2010)
 The Royal Society University Research Fellowship (2005)
 MRC New Investigator Award (2005)

Publications 

 Carrieri, F.A., Murray, P.J., Ditsova, D., Ferris, M.A., Davies, P., Dale, J.K (2019) CDK1 and CDK2 regulate NICD1 turnover and periodicity of the segmentation clock. EMBO Reports. 20, 4, p. 1-22 22 p., e46436 doi/10.15252/embr.201846436
 Murray, P., Carrieri, F.A., Dale, J.K. (2019) Cell cycle regulation of oscillations yields coupling of growth and from in a computational model of the presomitic mesoderm. Journal of Theoretical Biology. doi/10.1016/j.jtbi.2019.05.006
 Mastromina, I., Verrier L, Silva J.C, Storey K.G, and Dale J.K (2018) MYC activity is required for maintenance of the Neuromesodermal Progenitor signalling network and for correct timing of segmentation clock gene oscillations. doi/10.1242/dev.161091
 Meakin, P. J., Jalicy, S. M., Montagut , G., Allsop, D. J. P., Cavellini, D. L.,Irvine, S. W., McGinley, C., Liddell, M. K., McNeilly, A. D., Parmionova, K., Liu, Y., Bailey, C. S. L., Dale, J. K., Heisler, L. K., McCrimmon, R. J., Ashford, M. L. J. (2018) Bace1-dependent amyloid processing regulates hypothalamic leptin sensitivity in obese mice. Scientific Reports 8, Article number: 55 doi/10.1038/s41598-017-18388-6
 Bailey, C. S. L., Bone, R. A., Murray, P. J., Dale, J. K (2017) Temporal ordering of dynamic expression data from detailed spatial expression maps. doi/10.3791/55127
 Dale, K., Martí, E (2017) Introduction to the special section: Spinal Cord a model to understand CNS development and regeneration. doi/10.1016/j.ydbio.2017.10.005
 Carrieri FA and Dale JK (2016) Turn It Down a Notch. Front. Cell Dev. Biol. 4:151. doi/10.3389/fcell.2016.00151
 Ellis, P.S., Burbridge, S., Soubes, S., Ohyama, K., Ben-Haim, N., Chen, C., Dale, K., Shen, M.M., Constam, D., and Placzek, M. (2015) Pro Nodal acts via FGFR3 to govern duration of Shh expression in the prechordal mesoderm. Development. 142, 3821–3832.  doi/10.1242/dev.119628
 Wiedermann, G., Bone, R. A., Dale, J. K., et al. (2015) A balance of positive and negative regulators determines the pace of the segmentation clock. Elife 4: e05842. doi/10.7554/eLife.05842
 Stasiulewicz, M., S. D. Gray, S. D., Dale, J. K., et al. (2015) A conserved role for Notch signaling in priming the cellular response to Shh through ciliary localisation of the key Shh transducer Smo. Development 142(13): 2291–2303. doi/10.1242/dev.125237
 Bone, R. A., Bailey, C. S., Dale, J. K., et al. (2014) Spatiotemporal oscillations of Notch1, Dll1 and NICD are coordinated across the mouse PSM. Development 141(24): 4806–4816.  doi/10.1242/dev.115535
 Marlow, V.L., Cianfanelli, F.R., Porter, M., Cairns, L.S., Dale, J.K., and Stanley-Wall, N.R. (2014) The prevalence and origin of exoprotease-producing cells in the Bacillus subtilis biofilm. Microbiology. 160, 56–66. doi/10.1099/mic.0.072389-0
 Maroto, M., Bone, R. A., Dale, J. K (2012) Somitogenesis.  Development 139, 2453–2456. doi/10.1242/dev.069310
 Winzi, M. K., Hyttel, P., Dale, J. K., et al. (2011) Isolation and characterization of node/notochord-like cells from mouse embryonic stem cells. Stem Cells Dev 20(11): 1817–1827. doi/10.1089/scd.2011.0042
 Terry, A. J., Sturrock, M., Dale, J. K., Maroto, M., Chaplain, M. A. J. (2011) A spatio-temporal model of notch signalling in the zebrafish segmentation clock: conditions for synchronised oscillatory dynamics. PLoS One. 2011 Feb 28;6(2):e16980 doi/10.1371/journal.pone.0016980
 Gibb, S.M.M., Dale, J.K. (2010) The integration of signalling events during somitogenesis. Trends in Cell Biology, 20, 593–600.
 Gray, S. D. and Dale, J. K. (2010) Notch signalling regulates the contribution of progenitor cells from the chick Hensen's node to the floor plate and notochord. Development 137(4): 561–568. doi/10.1242/dev.041608
 Winzi, M.K., Hytell, P., Dale, J.K., and Serup, P. (2010) Isolation and characterisation of node/notochord-like cells from mouse embryonic stem cells.  Stem Cells and development, 20. 1817–1827. doi/10.1089/scd.2011.0042
 Ferjentsik, Z., Hayashi, S., Dale, J.K., Herreman, A., De Strooper, B., Bessho, Y. and Moroto, M. (2009) Notch is essential for the mouse segmentation clock. Developmental Biology, 331. doi/10.1016/j.ydbio.2009.1005.1262/1238
 Gray, S., Dale, J.K. (2009) The Role of Notch in the development of chick axial tissues. Mechanisms of Development. 126, S217-S217.  https://doi.org/10.1016/j.mod.2009.06.547
 Wright, D., Ferjentsik, Z., Chong, S-W., Qiu, X., Jiang, Y-J., Malapert, P., Pourquie, O., Van Hateren, N., Wilson, S.A., Franco, C., Gerhardt H., Dale, J.K., Maroto, M (2009) Cyclic Nrarp mRNA expression is regulated by the somitic oscillator but Nrarp but Nrarp protein levels do not oscillate. Dev Dyn. 238. 3043–3055. doi/10.1002/dvdy.22139
 Maroto, M., Limura, T., Dale, J.K., Bessho, Y. (2008) bHLH proteins and their role in somitogenesis. In "Somitogenesis". Landes Bioscience/Springer 124–139. doi.10.1007/978-0-387-09606-3 7
 Palmerim, I., Rodrigues, S., Dale, J.K., Maroto, M.(2008) Development on time. In "Cellular Oscilatory Mechanisms". Austin/New York. Landes Bioscience/Springer pp 62–68. doi/10.1007/978-0-387-09794-7
 Dale, J. K., P. Malapert, et al. (2006) Oscillations of the snail genes in the presomitic mesoderm coordinate segmental patterning and morphogenesis in vertebrate somitogenesis. Dev Cell 10(3): 355–366. doi/10.1016/j.devcel.2006.02.011
 Dale, J. K., M. Maroto, et al. (2003) Periodic notch inhibition by lunatic fringe underlies the chick segmentation clock. Nature 421(6920): 275–278. doi/10.1038/nature01244
 Dale, J. K., C. Vesque, et al. (1997) Cooperation of BMP7 and SHH in the induction of forebrain ventral midline cells by prechordal mesoderm. Cell 90(2): 257–269. doi.org/10.1016/S0092-8674(00)80334-7

References 

Living people
1971 births
Cell biologists
Academics of the University of Dundee
Fellows of the Royal Society of Biology
Alumni of University College London
21st-century British women scientists
Alumni of the University of Southampton
20th-century British women scientists
British women biologists
20th-century British biologists
21st-century British biologists
People from Cheltenham
Stowers Institute for Medical Research people